Giuseppe Biancani, SJ (Latin: Josephus Blancanus) (1566–1624) was an Italian Jesuit astronomer, mathematician, and selenographer, after whom the crater Blancanus on the Moon is named.

Biography 
Giuseppe Biancani was born in Bologna in 1566, entered the Jesuit Order in 1592, and studied at the College of Brescia with Marco Antonio De Dominis, and at the Academy of Mathematics in the Roman College with Clavius. Between 1596 and 1599 he lived in Padua, where he completed his studies and befriended Galileo, who had been appointed professor of mathematics at the local university in 1592. When the Jesuits were expelled from the Republic of Venice in 1606 Biancani went to Parma where he taught mathematics in the Jesuit College until his death in 1624.

Works 
In his Aristotelis loca mathematica ex universis ipsius operibus collecta et explicata, published in Bologna in 1615, Biancani discussed the Aristotelian views on floating bodies. The work suffered censorship whilst undergoing peer review, a common Jesuit practice. The reviewer, Giovanni Camerota, wrote: "It does not seem to be either proper or useful for the books of our members to contain the ideas of Galileo Galilei, especially when they are contrary to Aristotle."

Biancani wrote his Sphaera mundi, seu cosmographia demonstrativa, ac facili methodo tradita in 1615. However, it was not published until 1619 in Bologna, after the Decree of the Congregation of the Index in 1616.

In his Sphaera mundi, Biancani expounded on his belief that God had made the Earth a perfect symmetrical world: the highest mountain on land had its proportional equivalent in the lowest depth of the ocean.

The original Earth emerged on the third day of the creation myth as a perfectly smooth sphere, Biancani reasoned. If not for the hand of God, "natural law" would have allowed the Earth to remain in that form. Biancani believed, however, that God had created the depths of the sea and formed the mountains of the Earth.

Moreover, if left to "natural law," the Earth would be consumed in water, in imitation of how it was created. However, the hand of God would intervene in order to cause the Earth to be destroyed entirely by fire.

The contents of the book are described in Latin as: Sphaera Mundi seu Cosmographia. Demonstrativa, ac facili Methodo tradita: In qua totius Mundi fabrica, una cum novis, Tychonis, Kepleri, Galilaei, aliorumque; Astronomorum adinventis continetur. Accessere I. Brevis introductio ad Geographiam. II. Apparatus ad Mathematicarum studium. III. Echometria, idest Geometrica tractatio de Echo. IV. Novum instrumentum ad horologia describenda.
 
As evidenced in the table of contents, this work also presented a summary of the discoveries made with the telescope by Tycho Brahe, Johannes Kepler, Galileo, Copernicus, and others. The censorship of Biancani's previous work affected the manner in which he wrote Sphaera mundi. "But that this opinion [heliocentrism] is false," Biancani wrote, during his discussion on Copernican and Keplerian theories, "and should be rejected (even though it is established by better proofs and arguments) has nevertheless become much more certain in our day when it has been condemned by the authority of the Church as contrary to Sacred Scripture" (Sphaera, IV, 37).

The work not only included studies on the natural phenomenon of the echo and on sundials, but also included a diagram of the Moon. Giuseppe Biancani's map was not drawn up in support of new Copernican ideas but those berthed in traditional geocentric cosmology and in support of Aristotelian thought. Biancani disagreed with Galileo, who believed in the existence of lunar mountains. In a 1611 letter to Christoph Grienberger (after whom the Gruemberger crater is named), Biancani wrote of his certainty that there could not be any mountains on the Moon.

Biancani opined that the Copernican system was an opinionem falsam... ac rejeciendam.  Nevertheless, he remained ambivalent in the midst of the Scientific Revolution, as he cited Galileo's opinions on the surface of the Moon while also discussing those of the ancients, such as Posidonius and Cleomedes. Biancani adopted the Tychonic system battling the Aristotelianism of Mutio Vitelleschi, General of the Jesuit Order. He also maintained that the heavens were composed of fluid matter, not solid spheres, another anti-Aristotelian view.

Biancani's Constructio instrumenti ad horologia solaria discusses how to make a perfect sundial, with accompanying illustrations.
 
Bernhardus Varenius based much of his geographical work on Biancani's ideas.

List of works

Sources 
 
 
 Antiquarian Books: Biancani’s works

References

See also
List of Jesuit scientists
List of Roman Catholic scientist-clerics

1566 births
1624 deaths
17th-century Italian Jesuits
17th-century Italian astronomers
16th-century Italian mathematicians
17th-century Italian mathematicians
Jesuit scientists
Scientists from Bologna
16th-century Italian astronomers